These are the official results of the Women's 200m metres event at the 1984 Summer Olympics in Los Angeles, California. The final was held on August 9, 1984.

Coming into the final, future world record holder Florence Griffith had the fastest times in both the heats and semi final rounds. The winner of the other semi final, one hundredth behind was Valerie Brisco-Hooks, who had already won the 400 metres title. Brisco-Hooks, coming back after a  weight gain during her pregnancy two years earlier, was not touted as a potential multi gold medalist, unlike her American teammate Carl Lewis whose performance was virtually expected.  She did not accomplish the 200/400 double at the Olympic Trials.

In the final, Florence Griffith, running in lane four, the middle of the track, took the early lead through the turn. Griffith easily made up the stagger on her American teammate Randy Givens to her outside just after completing half the turn. In lane 2, Merlene Ottey-Page was the closest challenger, gaining on Kathy Cook between her and Griffith.  Out in lane 7, Brisco-Hooks caught Grace Jackson to her outside shortly after Griffith had passed Givens.  At the end of the turn, Griffith had a slight advantage on Ottey-Page, a metre up on Brisco-Hooks who was just slightly ahead of Cook. All the way down the home straight Griffith held her advantage over Ottey-Page, but Brisco-Hooks was in a different gear. Halfway down the straight, Brisco-Hooks had already caught the pair and was pulling away to an easy 3 metre victory. In the last 40 metres, Cook closed ground rapidly, diving for the line and just missing the bronze medal from Ottey-Page, while Griffith was less than a half a metre ahead. Jackson came from dead last at the end of the turn to finish a metre behind Ottey-Page and Cook.

Brisco-Hoocks accomplished the first 200-400 double in the Olympics. This was the second step of three gold medals in the single games won by Brisco-Hooks. To this point in history, only Fanny Blankers-Koen with 4 in 1948, and Betty Cuthbert in 1956 were the only women to have achieved this in Athletics. Four years alter, Griffith under her new married name Florence Griffith-Joyner, would also achieve three golds along with the silver medal in the 4x400 relay (where she took the baton from Brisco-Hooks).  This was the third medal out of what would become nine career Olympic medals for Ottey. That too is the most for a woman in Athletics, equaled in 2016 by Allyson Felix, who was coached in part by Brisco-Hooks and Griffith's coach, future brother-in-law, Bob Kersee.

Medalists

Abbreviations

Results

Heats
Qualification rule: First 5 in each heat (Q) and the next 2 fastest (q) advance to the quarterfinals.

Wind:Heat 1: -2.0 m/s, Heat 2: -0.4 m/s, Heat 3: -1.5 m/s, Heat 4: +0.9 m/s, Heat 5: +2.3 m/s, Heat 6: -0.7 m/s

Quarterfinals
Held on 1984-08-08

Semifinals
Held on 1984-08-09

Final

See also
 1982 Women's European Championships 200 metres (Athens)
 1983 Women's World Championships 200 metres (Helsinki)
 1984 Friendship Games 200 metres (Prague)
 1986 Women's European Championships 200 metres (Stuttgart)
 1987 Women's World Championships 200 metres (Rome)

References

External links
 Results
 Results

 
200 metres at the Olympics
1984 in women's athletics
Women's events at the 1984 Summer Olympics